Harrytoombsia is an extinct genus of arthrodire placoderm from the Early Frasnian stage of the Late Devonian period. Fossils are found from  Kimberley, Australia. It was a fast-swimming predator, and it had sharp blades of enamel-like material around the outer edge of the jaw for catching prey.

Phylogeny
Harrytoombsia is a member of the superfamily Incisoscutoidea, which belongs to the clade Coccosteomorphi, one of the two major clades within Eubrachythoraci. The cladogram below shows the phylogeny of Harrytoombsia:

References 

Arthrodires
Fossil taxa described in 1979